Eugene Hugh Beaumont (1909 or 1910 – May 14, 1982) was an American actor. He was best known for his portrayal of Ward Cleaver on the television series Leave It to Beaver, originally broadcast from 1957 to 1963; and as private detective Michael Shayne in a series of low-budget crime films in 1946 and 1947.

Early life
Beaumont was born in Lawrence, Kansas, to Ethel Adaline Whitney and Edward H. Beaumont, a traveling salesman whose profession kept the family on the move. After graduating from the Baylor School in Chattanooga, Tennessee in the class of 1930, he attended the University of Chattanooga, where he played football. He later studied at the University of Southern California and graduated with a master of theology in 1946.

Career
Beaumont began his career in show business in 1931 by performing in theaters, nightclubs, and radio. He began acting in motion pictures in 1940, appearing in over three dozen films. Many of those roles were bit parts and minor roles and were not credited. He often worked with actor William Bendix; they had prominent roles in the 1946 film noir The Blue Dahlia, playing the friends of star Alan Ladd's character. In 1946–1947, Beaumont starred in five films as private detective Michael Shayne, assuming the role from Lloyd Nolan. In 1950, he also narrated the short film A Date with Your Family.

In the early 1950s, Beaumont secured television work, often with guest roles on series such as Adventures of Superman, City Detective, Crossroads, Fireside Theatre, Ford Theatre, The Lone Ranger, Medic, The Millionaire, and Schlitz Playhouse of Stars. From 1951 to 1953, he narrated the Reed Hadley series Racket Squad, based on the cases of fictional detective Captain John Braddock in San Francisco. In 1954 and 1955, Beaumont appeared in The Public Defender, Hadley's second series, appearing in three episodes as Ed McGrath. That year, he guest-starred in the Lassie episode "The Well", one of two episodes filmed as pilots for the series. He also portrayed a sympathetic characterization of the Western bandit Jesse James on the series Tales of Wells Fargo.

In September 1957, Beaumont was selected to replace Max Showalter, who had appeared as Ward Cleaver in "It's a Small World", the original pilot for the sitcom Leave It to Beaver, in the role of wise small-town father Ward Cleaver. After initially airing to tepid ratings on CBS, the series moved to ABC for its second season, where it achieved more solid ratings. Beginning with the third season, Beaumont began directing several episodes; including the series' final episode "Family Scrapbook", often considered the first series finale. In 2014, TV Guide ranked Beaumont's portrayal of Ward Cleaver at number 28 on its list of the "50 Greatest TV Dads of All Time".

In 1959, before production on the third season of Leave It to Beaver began, Beaumont's wife, son and mother-in-law were driving from Minnesota to Hollywood to visit when a car accident killed his mother-in-law and severely injured his son. Jerry Mathers later stated that the tragedy seriously affected Beaumont's participation in the production, with Beaumont often just "walking through" his part.

After Leave It to Beaver ended production in 1963, Beaumont appeared in many community theater productions and played a few guest roles on television series such as Marcus Welby, M.D., Mannix, Petticoat Junction, The Virginian, and Wagon Train. In February 1966, he made another appearance on Lassie, 11 years after his first. He also continued to have success as a writer, selling several television screenplays and radio scripts as well as short stories to various magazines. He gradually left the entertainment business, launching a second career as a Christmas-tree farmer in Grand Rapids, Minnesota. He officially retired in 1972 after suffering a stroke from which he never fully recovered.

Personal life and death
On April 13, 1941, Beaumont wed actress Kathryn Adams (née Hohn) at the Hollywood Congregational Church. They had sons Hunter and Mark, and daughter Kristy. Their union lasted 33 years, until their divorce in 1974.

Beaumont was a lay minister in the Methodist Church. During World War II, he was a conscientious objector and served as a medic.

On May 14, 1982, Beaumont died of a heart attack while visiting his son Hunter, a psychologist, in Munich, West Germany. He was 72. His body was cremated, and the ashes scattered on the then family-owned Balgillo Island (informally known when Beaumont owned it as "Beaumont Island") on Lake Wabana, Minnesota, near Grand Rapids. The 1983 telemovie Still the Beaver was dedicated to him.

Filmography

Television credits

References

Further reading

External links
 
 
 

Date of birth missing
1982 deaths
20th-century American male actors
American male film actors
American male radio actors
American male television actors
California Republicans
Chattanooga Mocs football players
Male actors from Kansas
Male actors from Minnesota
People from Lawrence, Kansas
Players of American football from Kansas
University of Southern California alumni
University of Tennessee at Chattanooga alumni
American United Methodist clergy
20th-century Methodists